is a Japanese comedian. He is a former member of Japanese band UltraCats and current member of owarai group Summers.

Filmography 
 Peanuts (2006)
 Moomins on the Riviera (2015)

References 

 

1967 births
Japanese comedians
Japanese male musicians
Living people
Musicians from Tokyo
Comedians from Tokyo